A , also known as a  is an extremely long, highly specialized Japanese knife that is commonly used to fillet tuna, as well as many other types of large ocean fish.

The maguro bōchō is a long knife with a blade length of 30 cm (12 inches) to 150 cm (60 inches) in addition to a long handle. It can fillet a tuna in a single cut, although usually two people are needed to handle the knife and the tuna. The flexible blade can be curved to match the shape of the spine to minimize the amount of meat remaining on the tuna carcass.

They are commonly found at wholesale fish markets in Japan, the largest of which is the Tsukiji fish market in Tokyo, for which they are often called , as there is little need for them elsewhere. They may be found at very large restaurants, but they are not used in a regular Japanese kitchen, unless there is a frequent need to fillet tuna with a weight of 200 kg (440 pounds) or more.

They are not designed for use as weapons, but as tools, although they have been used as weapons by Yakuza. Often they are used by two people simultaneously, where the second person handles the other end, using a towel wrapped around the blade for protection.

See also
Japanese cutlery

References

Japanese kitchen knives
Fish processing